Quf or QUF may refer to:

 Quaker Universalist Fellowship
 Queensland United Foods, predecessor to Pauls (dairy)
 quf, alternate transliteration of the Hebrew letter Qof (ק)